Lecithocera signifera is a moth in the family Lecithoceridae. It was described by Cajetan Felder, Rudolf Felder and Alois Friedrich Rogenhofer in 1875. It is found in Sri Lanka.

References

Moths described in 1875
signifera